Fingrowth Co-operative Bank Ltd.(formerly  The Urban Co-operative Bank Ltd)  is a multi- state co-operative Bank. Its area of operation extends to the state of Rajasthan and Gujarat. The bank was founded in the year 1959 at Jaipur.

References 

Banks of India
Cooperative banks of India
Companies based in Rajasthan